James Anderson is an American television writer and actor. From 2000 to 2020, he was a writer for NBC's Saturday Night Live (SNL).

On SNL, he usually wrote with Kristen Wiig, and then with Cecily Strong. He wrote or co-wrote many queer-themed sketches like "Gays in Space" and "GP Yass". Anderson played himself on an episode of the network's  series 30 Rock.

He co-created the web series Hudson Valley Ballers with a fellow SNL writer and his longtime friend, Paula Pell, with whom he also co-stars. He also guest starred in the comedy mystery series Mapleworth Murders, created by Pell.

References

External links

Year of birth missing (living people)
Living people
American male television actors
American television writers
Place of birth missing (living people)
American male television writers
21st-century American screenwriters
Writers from Kentucky
American LGBT writers
21st-century American male writers